Chatra Assembly constituency   is an assembly constituency in the Indian state of Jharkhand.

Members of Assembly 
1980: Mahesh Ram, INC(I)
1985: Mahendra Prakash Singh Bhogta, Bharatiya Janata Party
1990: Mahendra Prakash Singh Bhogta, Bharatiya Janata Party
1995: Janardan Paswan, Janata Dal
2000: Satyanand Bhogta, Bharatiya Janata Party
2005: Satyanand Bhogta, Bharatiya Janata Party
2009: Janardan Paswan, Rashtriya Janata Dal
2014: Jay Prakash Singh Bhogta, Bharatiya Janata Party
2019: Satyanand Bhogta, Rashtriya Janata Dal

Election Results

2019

See also
Vidhan Sabha
List of states of India by type of legislature

References
Schedule – XIII of Constituencies Order, 2008 of Delimitation of Parliamentary and Assembly constituencies Order, 2008 of the Election Commission of India 

Assembly constituencies of Jharkhand